Bernhard Sieber (born 6 August 1990) is an Austrian rower. He competed in the men's lightweight double sculls event at the 2016 Summer Olympics.

References

External links
 

1990 births
Living people
Austrian male rowers
Olympic rowers of Austria
Rowers at the 2016 Summer Olympics
Place of birth missing (living people)